Catenulispora acidiphila is a Gram-positive bacterium from the genus of Catenulispora which has been isolated from forest soil from Gerenzano in Italy.

References

Actinomycetia
Bacteria described in 2006